British migration to Germany has resulted in a significant population, with 107,000 of the UK's citizens in Germany as of 2016. 

Migration has occurred in the context of World War II and the subsequent Allied occupation of Germany, and later with both nations as members of the European Union. Moreover,  Great Britain was in personal union with Electorate of Hanover, following the accession of George I to the throne of Great Britain in 1714.

References

Germany
Germany–United Kingdom relations
German people of British descent